Jiggers may refer to:
 Jiggers, an Iggy Arbuckle character
 Jiggers, alleyways in Liverpool, like chares in North-east England
 Tunga penetrans,  an aquatic-related parasite
 Jiggers, devices used by trainers in Thoroughbred racing in Australia to deliver electric shocks to horses

See also
 Jigger (disambiguation)